1934 in sports describes the year's events in world sport.

Alpine skiing
FIS Alpine World Ski Championships
4th FIS Alpine World Ski Championships are held at St Moritz, Switzerland.  The events are a downhill, a slalom and a combined race in both the men's and women's categories.  The winners are:
 Men's Downhill – David Zogg (Switzerland)
 Men's Slalom – Franz Pfnür (Germany)
 Men's Combined – David Zogg (Switzerland)
 Women's Downhill – Anny Rüegg (Switzerland)
 Women's Slalom – Christl Cranz (Germany)
 Women's Combined – Christl Cranz (Germany)

American football
NFL championship
 The New York Giants defeat the Chicago Bears 30–13 at the Polo Grounds, which is known as the "Sneakers Game"
College championship
 College football national championship – Minnesota Golden Gophers and Alabama Crimson Tide (shared)

Association football
International
 1934 World Cup held in Italy – Italy defeats Czechoslovakia 2–1 in the final.
 14 November – England defeats Italy 3–2 in the "Battle of Highbury".
England
 The Football League – Arsenal 59 points, Huddersfield 56, Tottenham 49, Derby 45, Manchester City 45, Sunderland 44
 FA Cup final – Manchester City 2 – 1 Portsmouth (Empire Stadium, Wembley, London)
Spain
 La Liga won by Athletic Bilbao
Germany
 National Championship won by Schalke 04
Italy
 Serie A won by Juventus
France
 French Division 1 won by FC Sète

Athletics
 9 June – Swiss runner Lina Aebersold sets a new world record in the women's 20 km walk in Zürich: 1:59:02.
 9 – 11 August - 1934 Women's World Games, London
 9 September – European Championships Marathon at Turin won by Arnas Toivonen (Finland) in a time of 2:52:29

Australian rules football
VFL Premiership
 Richmond wins the 38th VFL Premiership, beating South Melbourne 19.14 (128) to 12.17 (89) at Melbourne Cricket Ground (MCG) in the 1934 VFL Grand Final
Brownlow Medal
 The annual Brownlow Medal is awarded to Dick Reynolds (Essendon)
South Australian National Football League
 6 October – Glenelg win their first SANFL premiership, beating Port Adelaide 18.15 (123) to 16.18 (114)
 Magarey Medal awarded to “Blue” Johnson (Glenelg)
Western Australian National Football League
 13 October – West Perth 11.7 (73) defeat East Fremantle 5.9 (39) for their sixth WANFL premiership
 Sandover Medal awarded to Sammy Clarke (Claremont-Cottesloe)

Bandy
Sweden
 Championship final – Slottsbrons IF defeats IFK Uppsala 6–0 on the replay after a 1–1 tie in the first final.

Baseball

Major League Baseball 
 July 10 – In the second Major League Baseball All-Star Game, played at the Polo Grounds in New York City, left–handed pitcher Carl Hubbell sets a record by striking out Babe Ruth, Lou Gehrig, Jimmie Foxx, Al Simmons and Joe Cronin consecutively. The catcher was Gabby Hartnett and the American League won 9–7.
 October – St. Louis Cardinals defeat Detroit Tigers in the World Series, 4–3. Brothers Dizzy Dean and Paul Dean each won two games for the "Gas House Gang" Cardinals.  The Detroit Tigers gave up a great battle in the series but fell short a game.

International 
Australia
 August – The inaugural Claxton Shield is held in Adelaide, South Australia. The host South Australian team won the tournament, defeating New South Wales and Victoria.
Japan
 December 26 – Yomiuri Giants of Tokyo, officially founded, as first professional baseball club in Japan.

Basketball
Events
 The South American Basketball Championship 1934 in Buenos Aires is won by Argentina.

Boxing
Events
 14 June – Max Baer defeats Primo Carnera by an eleventh-round technical knockout at Long Island City to win the World Heavyweight Championship
Lineal world champions
 World Heavyweight Championship – Primo Carnera → Max Baer
 World Light Heavyweight Championship – Maxie Rosenbloom → Bob Olin
 World Middleweight Championship – vacant
 World Welterweight Championship – Jimmy McLarnin → Barney Ross → Jimmy McLarnin
 World Lightweight Championship – Barney Ross → vacant
 World Featherweight Championship – vacant
 World Bantamweight Championship – Panama Al Brown
 World Flyweight Championship – vacant

Canadian football
Grey Cup
 Sarnia Imperials defeat the Regina Roughriders 20–12

Cricket
Events
 England undertake their first Test match tour of India, winning two Tests to nil
 4 November – The inaugural Ranji Trophy begins with a match between Madras and Mysore at Chepauk, just over a year after Ranjitsinhji’s death.
England
 County Championship – Lancashire
 Minor Counties Championship – Lancashire Second Eleven
 Most runs – Harold Gibbons 2,654 @ 52.03 (HS 157)
 Most wickets – Tich Freeman 205 @ 23.18 (BB 8–103)
 Wisden Cricketers of the Year – Stan McCabe, Bill O‘Reilly, George Paine, Bill Ponsford, Jim Smith
Australia
 Sheffield Shield – Victoria
 Most runs – Don Bradman 1192 @ 132.44 (HS 253)
 Most wickets – Clarrie Grimmett 66 @ 21.83 (BB 7–57)
India
 Bombay Quadrangular – not contested
New Zealand
 Plunket Shield – Auckland
South Africa
 Currie Cup – Western Province
West Indies
 Inter-Colonial Tournament – Trinidad

Cycling
Tour de France
 Antonin Magne wins the 28th Tour de France
Giro d'Italia
 Learco Guerra of Maino wins the 22nd Giro d'Italia

Figure skating
World Figure Skating Championships
 World Men's Champion – Karl Schäfer
 World Women's Champion – Sonja Henie
 World Pairs Champions – Emília Rotter and László Szollás

Golf
Events
 Inaugural Masters Tournament is held at Augusta National Golf Club in Georgia, USA. Until 1939, it is known as the Augusta National Invitational Tournament.
Men's professional
 Augusta National Invitational Tournament – Horton Smith
 U.S. Open – Olin Dutra
 British Open – Henry Cotton
 PGA Championship – Paul Runyan
Men's amateur
 British Amateur – Lawson Little
 U.S. Amateur – Lawson Little
Women's professional
 Women's Western Open – Marian McDougall

Harness racing
USA
 Hambletonian – Lord Jim
 Kentucky Futurity – Princess Peg

Horse racing
England
 Champion Hurdle – Chenango
 Cheltenham Gold Cup – Golden Miller
 Grand National – Golden Miller
 1,000 Guineas Stakes – Campanula
 2,000 Guineas Stakes – Colombo
 The Derby – Windsor Lad
 The Oaks – Light Brocade
 St. Leger Stakes – Windsor Lad
Australia
 Melbourne Cup – Peter Pan III
Canada
 King's Plate – Horometer
France
 Prix de l'Arc de Triomphe – Brantôme
Ireland
 Irish Grand National – Poolgowran
 Irish Derby Stakes – Patriot King and Primero
USA
 Kentucky Derby – Cavalcade
 Preakness Stakes – High Quest
 Belmont Stakes – Peace Chance

Ice hockey
Stanley Cup
 Chicago Black Hawks defeat Detroit Red Wings 3 games to 1
Ice Hockey World Championships
 
Events
 18 September – The Norwegian Ice Hockey Federation founded

Motorsport

Multi-sport events
 2nd British Empire Games held in London, England
 10th Far Eastern Championship Games held in Manila

Nordic skiing
FIS Nordic World Ski Championships
 8th FIS Nordic World Ski Championships 1934 are held at Sollefteå, Sweden

Rowing
The Boat Race
 17 March — Cambridge wins the 86th Oxford and Cambridge Boat Race

Rugby league
1934 New Zealand rugby league season
1934 NSWRFL season
1933–34 Northern Rugby Football League season / 1934–35 Northern Rugby Football League season

Rugby union
 47th Home Nations Championship series is won by England

Snooker
 World Snooker Championship – Joe Davis beats Tom Newman 25–23

Speed skating
Speed Skating World Championships
 Men's All-round Champion – Bernt Evensen (Norway)

Tennis
Australia
 Australian Men's Singles Championship – Fred Perry (Great Britain) defeats Jack Crawford (Australia) 6–3, 7–5, 6–1
 Australian Women's Singles Championship – Joan Hartigan Bathurst (Australia) defeats Margaret Molesworth (Australia) 6–1, 6–4
England
 Wimbledon Men's Singles Championship – Fred Perry (Great Britain) defeats Jack Crawford (Australia) 6–3, 6–0, 7–5
 Wimbledon Women's Singles Championship – Dorothy Round Little (Great Britain) defeats Helen Jacobs (USA) 6–2, 5–7, 6–3
France
 French Men's Singles Championship – Gottfried von Cramm (Germany) defeats Jack Crawford (Australia) 6–4, 7–9, 3–6, 7–5, 6–3
 French Women's Singles Championship – Margaret Scriven Vivian (Great Britain) defeats Helen Jacobs (USA) 7–5, 4–6, 6–1
USA
 American Men's Singles Championship – Fred Perry (Great Britain) defeats Wilmer Allison (USA) 6–4, 6–3, 3–6, 1–6, 8–6
 American Women's Singles Championship – Helen Jacobs (USA) defeats Sarah Palfrey Cooke (USA) 6–1, 6–4
Davis Cup
 1934 International Lawn Tennis Challenge –  at 4–1  at Centre Court, Wimbledon (grass) London, United Kingdom

Yacht racing
 The New York Yacht Club retains the America's Cup as Rainbow defeats British challenger Endeavour, of the Royal Yacht Squadron, 4 races to 2

Awards
 Associated Press Female Athlete of the Year – Virginia Van Wie, LPGA golf
 Associated Press Male Athlete of the Year – Dizzy Dean, Major League Baseball

Notes
The Irish Derby Stakes was a dead heat.

References

 
Sports by year